Carl Jackson Irvin, Jr. (January 16, 1929 – January 25, 2008) was an American politician. He served in the Georgia House of Representatives from 1973 to 1985 as Democrat.

References

2008 deaths
1929 births
People from Habersham County, Georgia
Democratic Party members of the Georgia House of Representatives
20th-century American politicians